Chater is an unincorporated area in the Rural Municipality of Cornwallis in the Canadian province of Manitoba.

It is located near Brandon, Manitoba.

References

Unincorporated communities in Westman Region